Jatropha cathartica is a species of flowering plant in the spurge family, Euphorbiaceae, that is native to Texas in the United States and Coahuila, Nuevo León and Tamaulipas in northeastern Mexico. Common names include jicamilla (Spanish) and Berlandier's nettlespurge.

Description
Jatropha cathartica is a perennial herb that grows from an enlarged, tuberlike woody root (caudex). It is deciduous, losing both stems and leaves, and spends the winter in a dormant state.

Caudex
It is underground in the wild but becomes exposed if cultivated in a container.

Stems

Leaves
Leaves are gray-green, palmate, very deeply lobed five to seven times, and up to 10 cm long.

Flowers
The flowers are showy, bright pink to poppy-red, and arrayed in loose clusters at the ends of long peduncles. Each inflorescence bears individual flowers up to 12 mm wide, of which 3–4 are female and 10–12 are male. It blooms throughout the growing season from February to November, but mainly in summer.

Fruit
The fruit is a green, pea-like three-lobed capsule containing three seeds.

Habitat
Berlandier's nettlespurge grows scattered among brush, usually on clay soil in hot, arid regions. This plant has adapted to drought and can survive many days without rain. It will grow in sun or shade, but will rot in a cold, damp environment.

References

cathartica
Plants described in 1832
Flora of Coahuila
Flora of Nuevo León
Flora of Tamaulipas
Flora of Texas
Caudiciform plants